The River Mint is a river in Cumbria, England. The Mint starts life at Whelpside at the confluence of Bannisdale Beck, running south-east from Bannisdale Head, and a smaller stream draining a group of small valleys from headwaters in The Forest, Combs Hollow and Mabbin Crag.

The river runs south to Patton Bridge, picking up a series of smaller tributaries, before turning south west, continuing through the hamlet of Meal Bank.

The Mint drains into the River Kent at a point between Mintsfeet and Kentrigg just north of Kendal.

Mint, River
1Mint